The Presidents of the United States of America (occasionally referred to as PUSA, PotUSA, The Presidents of the USA or simply The Presidents) were an American alternative rock band formed in Seattle, Washington, in 1993. The three-piece group's initial line-up consisted of vocalist and bassist Chris Ballew, drummer Jason Finn, and guitarist Dave Dederer. The band became popular in the mid-1990s for their hits "Lump" and "Peaches"—released in 1995 and 1996, respectively—which helped their self-titled debut album go 3× platinum.

The group broke up for the first time in late 1997 because their singer Chris Ballew wanted a solo career; they performed a farewell concert early the next year. They reunited in 2002. In 2004, Dederer left the group and was replaced by Andrew McKeag. The Presidents privately disbanded in 2015, and the news was made public a year later.

History

Early years (1993–1994) 
The band was formed in late 1993 by Chris Ballew (bass guitar and lead vocals) and Dave Dederer (guitar and backup vocals), who met while attending The Bush School in Seattle. Ballew had previously been in a punk-busker band called Egg, who wrote many songs that would later be turned into PUSA songs. Initially a drummerless duo, Ballew and Dederer performed a half-dozen or so shows in 1993 as "The Lo-Fis", "The Dynamic Duo", and "Pure Frosting". Ballew eventually came upon the name "The Presidents of the United States of America". Shortly after settling on their name, Ballew and Dederer added drummer Jason Finn; the band played their first show as a trio at Seattle's Romper Room in early December 1993. At the time, Finn was also the drummer in the band Love Battery, who had recently changed record labels from Sub Pop to Atlas Records, an A&M subsidiary.

The Presidents recorded a ten-song cassette, Froggystyle, in early 1994 in one day at Laundry Room Studios. The band sold the cassette at shows in 1994. Finn also sold the cassette from behind the bar of Seattle's Comet Tavern, where he tended bar.

Rise to fame (1994–1998) 
In 1994, the band signed with the independent Seattle label PopLlama Records and released their self-titled debut in the following year. The band also released a limited edition blue vinyl 7" single, "Fuck California", on C/Z Records. Columbia Records signed the band shortly thereafter and re-released the album in late July 1995. Driven by the singles "Lump", "Peaches", and "Kitty", their debut album has been certified triple Platinum by the RIAA.

A follow-up album, II, received similar praise, but did not match the commercial success that the Presidents' debut album had, though it was still certified gold in the US.

Throughout 1995, 1996 and 1997, the band made worldwide tours to support their first two albums. In 1996, MTV aired a previously recorded live concert of the band from Mount Rushmore for Presidents Day. They were introduced with: "Ladies and gentlemen, the Presidents of the United States." In addition to relentless touring in the U.S. and Canada, PUSA made multiple tours of Europe, Australia, New Zealand and Japan. They also made many appearances in major print media and on radio and TV, including multiple appearances on The Tonight Show with Jay Leno and the Late Show with David Letterman in the U.S. The Presidents turned down an offer to perform on Saturday Night Live in the fall of 1995 because the date conflicted with Ballew's wedding, but later made an appearance on the eleventh episode of Mad TV in January 1996. The band began the program with a skit called "Public Domain", performed "Lump" later in the show and "When the Saints Go Marching In" during the end credits.

Pure Frosting, collaborations and break-up (1998–2000) 
The band broke up in January 2000 as Ballew quit to spend more time with his young family and explore other musical terrain. Pure Frosting, a final album composed of new songs, covers, and demos, was released in 1998. The CD also contained videos for "Lump", "Peaches", "Mach 5", and "Dune Buggy".

Pure Frosting featured two songs that had previously been used in a movie and as a television show theme. "Video Killed the Radio Star" was included on the soundtrack for The Wedding Singer, while "Cleveland Rocks", originally recorded by Ian Hunter, was chosen as the theme song for The Drew Carey Show. Another song on the album, "Man (Opposable Thumb)", appeared in the Nickelodeon-produced motion picture Good Burger but was not directly written or performed for the film.

The Presidents also wrote the theme song for the 1998 TV movie My Date with the President's Daughter. They also performed a cover of the George of the Jungle theme song for the 1997 movie of the same name. This performance is not available on any of their albums.

In 1998, the group appeared on the album Happy Hour by Japanese female rockers Shonen Knife (also a three piece); they did backing vocals on the song "Sushi Bar".

The Presidents also collaborated with Sir Mix-A-Lot as Subset, a short-lived rock and hip-hop band. They had a brief tour and recorded several songs, but never released an album. The band broke up because Sir Mix-A-Lot wanted to take the band in a harder, more electronic direction, but Finn and Dederer were not interested.

Brief reformation and break-up (2000–2003) 
The Presidents reunited in 2000 to release a new single, "Jupiter", on MUSICBLITZ Records. Because of the single's popularity, the label convinced the band to release a new album. Freaked Out & Small was released that year to critical praise. The band did not tour on or promote the album, which quietly sold 25,000 copies as MUSICBLITZ, an early digital music player, quickly went bankrupt.

Afterward, the band members once again went their own ways. Ballew continued to produce and record his own work, becoming a children's artist under the name Caspar Babypants and collaborated with Tad Hutchison of The Young Fresh Fellows as The Chris and Tad Show. Also during this time, The Young Fresh Fellows recorded a song, "Good Times Rock 'N' Roll", about The Presidents, which appeared on the 2001 album Because We Hate You.

Full reformation and new guitarist (2003–2010) 

In 2003, the band once again reformed. In August 2004, the band released Love Everybody on their newly formed indie label PUSA Inc. As with their previous albums, it received praise from many critics. Two singles from the album have been released through the Apple iTunes Store. In late 2004, the rights to the debut album were returned to the band, who have since reissued the album through PUSA Inc. twice: once as a tenth-anniversary edition with extra tracks, and again in the spring of 2006 in a low-price edition.

Andrew McKeag, Seattle guitarist (formerly of Uncle Joe's Big Ol' Driver, Shuggie, The Black Panties and others), joined the band on guitar in late 2004, as an occasional live-performance stand-in for Dave Dederer, who had expressed an interest in spending more time with his family. Since late 2007, McKeag started touring full-time with the band, and later replaced Dederer. Dederer has played live with the band in concerts in Seattle on occasion.

In November 2007, the band's next album, These Are the Good Times People, was announced; it was released on March 11, 2008. They performed a live webcast celebrating the album's release by Easy Street Records. In December 2007 KEXP played the new song "Bad Times". On February 1, 2008, 107.7-The End, a Seattle radio station, played "Mixed Up S.O.B.", the first single from the Presidents' new album. The music video for the song was directed by "Weird Al" Yankovic. On June 15, 2008, they played for Pet-Aid 2008 in Oregon.

In October 2008, "Lump" was released on the video game Rock Band 2. "Ladybug", "Feather Pluck'n", and "Dune Buggy" were released as downloadable content for the game on November 4, 2008. In the summer of 2009, The Presidents performed in San Diego at the North Park Music Thing Music & Media Festival which only showcases local bands.

Final years (2010–2015) 
In August 2010, The Presidents performed at Skokie's Backlot Bash outside of Chicago. In September 2010, they played during halftime of the UW-Syracuse game at Husky Stadium.

On March 5, 2011, The Presidents performed a new tribute song, "Can't Stop (Catchin' 'Em All)" at the Nintendo World launch event for the video games Pokémon Black and White.

In 2012, Columbia Records re-released Lump, a discount greatest hits compilation.

On November 12, 2012, The Presidents performed during halftime of the Seattle Sounders FC–LA Galaxy playoff soccer game at CenturyLink Field.

In November 2013, the band started a PledgeMusic project in order to release a new studio album. The band met their goal in just over a week, and the album, titled Kudos to You!, was released on February 14, 2014. The band also released their first full live album, Thanks for the Feedback, at the same time. Since the beginning of the project, fans were able to pledge for various items in addition to the digital and physical copies of the two albums, such as posters, lyric sheets and instruments signed by the band. A limited edition burgundy and yellow vinyl was also available to backers.

On November 16, 2016, Chris Ballew stated that the band had dissolved sometime in the summer of 2015 as they wanted to move on, calling themselves "old people now".

Post-2016: Solo work, album vinyl re-release 
Following the breakup, each band member devoted time to his own solo projects. Ballew was the most prolific of the three, releasing albums with The Giraffes and The Tycoons, two of his side projects. Dederer collaborated with former Guns N' Roses bassist Duff McKagan as The Gentlemen and in McKagan's perennial hard rock band, Loaded, including contributing to the album Dark Days. Dederer also played bass in the Seattle band Juke and produced songs for singer/songwriter Gerald Collier. Finn played drums for several bands, including Nevada Bachelors, The Fastbacks and Love Battery, his original band.

Around 2016, Chris Ballew began collaborating with Seattle-based rapper Outtasite as The Feelings Hijackers. They have done local shows and have released two albums.

In 2009, in addition to his continued work with The Presidents, Ballew began recording and performing as children's artist Caspar Babypants.

In 2020, the band used Kickstarter to re-issue their self-titled debut album for the 25th anniversary of its original release as a green-colored vinyl. Different pledge tier levels were available that provided extras such as the ability to get the LP signed, anniversary t-shirts, enamel pins, etc. The LP used the remaster that was initially used on the 2004 10th anniversary release.

On 6 December 2022, the band announced a limited-edition vinyl reissue of their demo tape Froggystyle. On February 24, 2023, the demo was released on streaming services such as Spotify and Apple Music.

Musical style
The Presidents of the United States of America have been most frequently described as alternative rock, and pop-punk. They have also been described as post-grunge. Although they have been fairly consistently labelled as grunge by the media, The New York Times at the time of their debut in 1995, considered them "an antidote to the misery and self-absorption of grunge". The Washington Post claimed that the band, "without a hint of angst", "have revived the pleasures of pure pop."

Band members 

 Chris Ballew – lead vocals, bass (1993–2016)
 Dave Dederer – guitar, backing vocals (1993–2005)
 Jason Finn  – drums, backing vocals (1993–2016)
 Andrew McKeag – guitar, backing vocals (2005–2016)

Timeline

Discography

Studio albums 
 The Presidents of the United States of America (1995)
 II (1996)
 Freaked Out and Small (2000)
 Love Everybody (2004)
 These Are the Good Times People (2008)
 Kudos to You! (2014)

References

External links 

1993 establishments in Washington (state)
Alternative rock groups from Washington (state)
American musical trios
American grunge groups
American post-grunge musical groups
American punk rock groups
Columbia Records artists
C/Z Records artists
Musical groups established in 1993
Musical groups disestablished in 1998
Musical groups reestablished in 2000
Musical groups disestablished in 2002
Musical groups reestablished in 2003
Musical groups disestablished in 2015
Musical groups from Seattle
PopLlama Records artists
Pop punk groups from Washington (state)
Sony Music artists
Tooth & Nail Records artists